The Annenberg Foundation is a family foundation that provides funding and support to non-profit organizations in the United States and around the world. Some of the Foundation's core initiatives are the Annenberg/Corporation for Public Broadcasting (CPB) project (now Annenberg Learner), which funds many educational television shows broadcast on Public Broadcasting Service (PBS) public television in the United States as well as The Annenberg Community Beach House, The Annenberg Space for Photography, Metabolic Studio, explore.org, Wallis Annenberg PetSpace and the Wallis Annenberg Center for Performing Arts.

Overview

The Annenberg Foundation receives grants from the Bill and Melinda Gates Foundation.

The Annenberg Foundation continues its programming focus, but its efforts include environmental stewardship, social justice, and animal welfare. The foundation has roots as a traditional grantmaking institution and is also involved in the community. The Annenberg Foundation promotes charitable activities through which large-scale solutions to systemic problems are pursued.

The foundation has $1,59B in assets.

The following current projects are implemented by Annenberg Foundation Trustees and guided by their philanthropic vision:

Ownership and Board of Directors
Walter H. Annenberg headed the Annenberg Foundation until his death in 2002. Leonore, his wife, ran it until her death in March 2009. Since then, the foundation's trusteeship has been led by Wallis Annenberg and three of her children: Lauren Bon, Gregory Annenberg Weingarten and Charles Annenberg Weingarten.

Chairman of the Board, President and CEO, Wallis Annenberg
Vice President and Director, Lauren Bon
Vice President and Director, Gregory Annenberg Weingarten
Vice President and Director, Charles Annenberg Weingarten

Projects
The Annenberg Foundation is involved in a number of projects, some of which are listed below.

Annenberg Alchemy
Alchemy is a free non-profit leadership development program that offers capacity building with a focus on the strength of Executive Directors and Board Chairs. Participation is open to non-profits with operating budgets of $2 million or less based in Los Angeles County, California. However, the Executive Director and Board Chairperson are asked to participate together through the duration of the training. Among the issues addressed are effective governance, fundraising, and public accountability.

The Annenberg Community Beach House
Spearheaded by Wallis Annenberg's commitment for building community spaces, The Annenberg Community Beach House at Santa Monica State Beach opened in 2009.

Annenberg Learner
Annenberg Learner, formerly Annenberg Media, is an entity of the Annenberg Foundation that creates educational resources (video, print, and Web-based) to improve teaching methods and subject-matter expertise. Their K–12 and higher education resources are distributed to schools, non-commercial community agencies, colleges and universities. Annenberg Learner delivers its materials free-of-charge through learner.org. The website, which also houses interactive activities, downloadable guides, and resources coordinated with each video series, receives more than 10 million visits per month from teachers and learners worldwide. The website offers integrated multimedia K–12 materials to teachers for in-class use and professional development.  Programs are also available for viewer's use at home.

The Annenberg Retreat at Sunnylands
The Annenberg Retreat at Sunnylands in Rancho Mirage, California, is the former private estate of Mr. and Mrs. Walter H. Annenberg. It opened in March 2012 as a high-level retreat, historic house, and visitor center. Sunnylands has been informally referred to as "Camp David West". It has been visited by numerous U.S. Presidents, heads of state, and international dignitaries. The visitor center includes a  desert garden, historical exhibitions and programming highlighting its architectural significance as well as the Annenberg's collections of art.

The Annenberg Space for Photography
The Annenberg Space for Photography, was an exhibit space for where digital and print photography. The Space held roughly two exhibits per year of digital technology or traditional prints by established and emerging photographers. It was in Los Angeles' Century City district, across the street from Century Plaza Hotel. On June 8, 2020, it was announced that the facility will not re-open following the closing in March due to pandemic.

Photographers that have been exhibited include John Baldessari, Lauren Greenfield, Timothy Greenfield-Sanders, Walter Iooss, Lynn Johnson, Douglas Kirkland, Neil Leifer, Michael Nichols, Catherine Opie, Matthew Rolston, Julius Shulman, Melvin Sokolsky, John Stanmeyer, Bert Stern, Tim Street-Porter, Tyen and Albert Watson, Harun Mehmedinovic, Gavin Heffernan.

Exhibits
 March 23, 2013 - June 2, 2013 – War/Photography: Images of Armed Conflict and Its Aftermath
 October 26, 2013 - April 27, 2014 – The Power of Photography: National Geographic 125 Years
 May 31, 2014 - September 28, 2014 – Country: Portraits of an American Sound – regarding country music
 October 24, 2015 - March 20, 2016  – Life: A Journey Through Time (Frans Lanting)
 April 23, 2016 – August 21, 2016 – Refugee
 September 24, 2016 - February 26, 2017 – Identity: Timothy Greenfield-Sanders The List Portraits
 October 22, 2016 - February 26, 2017 – #girlgaze: a frame of mind
 April 8, 2017 - August 13, 2017 – Generation Wealth by Lauren Greenfield
 September 9, 2017 - March 4, 2018 – Cuba is & Resolviendo
 April 21, 2018 – September 9, 2018 – Not an Ostrich: And Other Images from America’s Library
 October 13, 2018 – January 13, 2019 – "National Geographic Photo Ark"
 April 26, 2019 – August 18, 2019 – "CONTACT HIGH: A Visual History of Hip-Hop"

Explore.org
Led by Charles Annenberg Weingarten, Explore is a multimedia organization that creates video documentaries and photographic essays about non-profit organizations around the world. Explore team members document their missions, which include traditional philanthropic site visits to potential grantees whose leaders have devoted their lives to extraordinary causes. Explore combines global grant-making, filmmaking, and photography as tools to educate and inspire.

The Metabolic Studio
The Metabolic Studio is Lauren Bon’s practice at the intersection of art and philanthropy.  The Studio incorporates creativity and innovation to remediate brownfields, places incapable of supporting life.  Ms. Bon’s signature projects include: Not A Cornfield, 2005–2006;  Farmlab, 2006–2008;  Strawberry Flag, 2009–2010;  and Silver and Water, 2006–Present.  Ms. Bon’s work creates solutions to critical social issues, often engaging complex bureaucracies including the California Department of Parks and Recreation, Veterans Administration, California State Lands Commission, and the Los Angeles Department of Water and Power.

The Wallis Annenberg Heart Program
Coordinating with the Los Angeles Fire Department and the Los Angeles County Fire Department as well as private and public healthcare agencies, the Wallis Annenberg Heart Program, helped create a new paramedic system for improving the diagnosis and treatment of chest pain in thousands of Los Angeles area residents each year.  Implemented in 2005, the new method replaced previous 4-lead EKG procedures, with a more accurate and revealing 12-lead system that helps paramedics and hospital-based physicians better diagnose and treat patients with symptoms of heart attacks.

The Ballona Wetlands Restoration Project
On January 28, 2013, the Annenberg Foundation signed a Memorandum of Understanding with the California Department of Fish and Wildlife and several other state agencies to explore the possibility of constructing a 46,000 square foot facility in the protected Ballona Wetlands Ecological Reserve which would have included adoption and veterinary services for domestic pets. However, on December 2, the Foundation announced that it was suspending its plans. The Los Angeles Times reported that some wetlands advocates had opposed the proposal. The Los Angeles Daily News noted that this was the Foundation's second failed attempt to construct this project on public land. The LA Times' and LA Daily News' editorial boards had called the project "a bad fit" and "inappropriate," respectively.

Other organizations and programs of the Foundation

Annenberg Challenge: In 1993, the largest gift to public education was made by Ambassador Walter Annenberg, a $500 million grant named the Annenberg Challenge. The grant was designed to unite the resources throughout the United States and ideas of those committed to increasing the effectiveness of public schooling. Recognizing that no single gift could improve all schools, the Challenge served as a catalyst to energize and support educational reform efforts across the country.

Annenberg Institute at Brown University: The Annenberg Institute at Brown University was established in 1993 through an anonymous gift of $5 million. Several months later, a $50-million gift – part of Ambassador Walter H. Annenberg's $500-million Challenge to the Nation to improve public education in America – enabled the fledgling Institute to expand the scope of its work. In appreciation of the Ambassador's gift, the Annenberg Institute was renamed in his honor. The Institute adopted its current mission in 1998: "To develop, share, and act on knowledge that improves the conditions and outcomes of schooling in America, especially in urban communities and in schools serving disadvantaged children."

The Annenberg Public Policy Center of the University of Pennsylvania: The Annenberg Public Policy Center of the University of Pennsylvania developed FactCheck.org. Factcheck.org monitors the factual accuracy of what is said by major U.S. political players in the form of TV ads, debates, speeches, interviews and news releases.

The Annenberg School for Communication at the University of Pennsylvania: The Annenberg School for Communication at the University of Pennsylvania offers students a firm grounding in various approaches to the study of communication and its methods, drawn from both the humanities and the social sciences.

The Annenberg School for Communication and Journalism of the University of Southern California: The Annenberg School for Communication & Journalism fosters dynamic synergies and multidisciplinary approaches to the study of communication and journalism through unparalleled access to the nation's and the world's entertainment, mass media and technology industries. With more than 83 full-time faculty members and 120 adjunct professors, more than 2,200 undergraduate and graduate students are served. The school houses dozens of research and public interest programs, including the Norman Lear Center and the Knight Digital Media Center. USC Annenberg has become a center for discussion among scholars and professionals in journalism, communication, public policy, media, and education.

Other programs and projects 
Ocean Alliance's Tarr and Wonson Paint Manufactory: The foundation provided funding to help purchase, preserve and restore the Tarr and Wonson Paint Manufactory in Gloucester, Massachusetts.  This historic 1863 building at the entrance to the harbor will become the headquarters for Ocean Alliance, a world-renowned nonprofit oceanographic research center.

Wallis Annenberg Center for the Performing Arts (Beverly Hills, California): This effort preserves the landmark, historic Beverly Hills Post Office (adjacent to Beverly Hills City Hall) by transforming the building into a performing arts and cultural facility for the presentation of theater, dance, music, professional children's theater and other cultural activities. The Center features a 500-seat theater, 150-seat studio theater/rehearsal hall, classrooms, café, gift shop, and sculpture garden. The center opened to the public in October 2013.

The Universally-Accessible Treehouse in Torrance, California: The first universally accessible treehouse in a public space in California was opened April 10, 2005, at Wilson Park in Torrance, California.  The treehouse, a  wooden structure, was designed to give children and adults of all ages and physical abilities an awe-inspiring experience—and a bird's eye view. Created as a service to the immediate community and as an inspiration for others, nearly 30 treehouses have been built nationally.

References

External links

 Annenberg Foundation
 The Annenberg Space for Photography
 The Annenberg Community Beach House
 The Wallis Annenberg Center for Performing Arts
 Annenberg Learner at learner.org
 Annenberg Retreat at Sunnylands
 Annenberg Political Fact Check A nonpartisan, nonprofit consumer advocate which monitors the factual accuracy of statements by political players
 Annenberg Center for Health Sciences

Foundations based in the United States
Organizations established in 1989
1989 establishments in California
Annenberg
Non-profit organizations based in Los Angeles